Judge Howell may refer to:

Beryl A. Howell (born 1956), judge of the United States District Court for the District of Columbia
David Howell (jurist) (1747–1824), judge of the United States District Court for the District of Rhode Island
George Evan Howell (1905–1980)m judge of the United States Court of Claims

See also
Justice Howell (disambiguation)